N.K.Damodaran (1909–1996) was a writer and translator of  Kerala, India.
He was born on 3 August 1909 in  Aranmula in Pathanamthitta district in Kerala.  
After taking B.A.B.L. he joined government service as Accounts Officer and later worked in SPCS.  
He has also worked as Sub editor in Sarvavijnana kosam and as  Editor in Kalakaumudi weekly.
He has published more than 20 books. He got Kalyani Krishna Menon Prize in 1967 and Sovietland Nehru award    in 1974.  His prime contribution was in the area of translation and he was the first to translate Fyodor Dostoyevsky's novels into Malayalam.

He died on 28 June 1996.  
He has six children namely Prasannakumari, Dr. Santhadevi, Krishnakumari, Dr. Syamaladevi, Dr. S.C. Bose, Adv. P S Laila.

Major works

Kerala sahithyam
Kusumarchana
Karamasov Sahodaranmar
Ninditharum  Peeditharum
Adithattukkal
Thamassakthi
Maricha Veedu
Boothavishtar

References

Malayali people
Writers from Kerala
Malayalam-language writers
20th-century Indian translators
1909 births
1996 deaths
People from Aranmula
Recipients of the Kerala Sahitya Akademi Award